John W. Derr (born March 18, 1941) was a Maryland State Senator representing District 3.

Background
Derr was first elected in 1983 to represent District 3, which covers parts of Frederick and Washington Counties.  In 1986, Derr defeated his political challenger, Democrat Gerald Downs, who only received 32% of the vote.

In 1990, Senator Derr was not challenged and received 100% of the vote.  In the 1994 primary election, Derr received more competition, this time from Republican Charles R. Luttrell.  Luttrell managed to garner 47% of the vote.  Derr went on to win the general election, this time, oddly enough, beating the same candidate, Charles R. Luttrell, who apparently switched parties to challenge Derr again.

In 1998, Derr saw the end of his senatorial career.  He was defeated by Republican challenger Alex X. Mooney in the Republican primary election.  Mooney received a sizable majority of the votes, 63% to Derr's 37%.  Mooney went on to win the general election, defeating the Democrat Ronald S. Bird.

Education
Derr attended Frederick High School in Frederick, MD. After high school, he received his B.S. from the University of Maryland in 1963. To become a chartered life underwriter (C.L.U.), Derr graduated from The American College in 1977.

Career
Prior to his political career, Derr served in U.S. Army Reserves from 1963 until 1969. He then started his career as an insurance agent. In 1982, Derr political career began to take shape when he became a member of the Republican Local Central Committee.  Derr was selected as a delegate to the Republican Party National Convention in 1996.

Derr is a past president of the Frederick Jaycees, and was named Jaycee International Senator in 1977. He is also a past president of the Frederick County Heart Association.  Derr belongs to the Frederick Life Underwriters Association and is a member of the board of trustees for Frederick Memorial Hospital .

While serving in the Maryland State Senate, Derr rose to the level of the Minority Whip from 1996 until he was defeated in 1999.  He was the Senate Chair for the Joint Committee on Protocol and he was the chair of the Frederick County Delegation from 1995 until 1999.

An article in the Washington Post suspected that Derr was defeated because of his view on abortion rights.  F. Vernon Boozer suffered the same fate with his views on abortion and gun control in his loss to Andrew Harris.

References and notes

External links
 http://www.msa.md.gov/msa/mdmanual/05sen/former/html/msa12132.html

Republican Party Maryland state senators
1941 births
Living people
University of Maryland, College Park alumni
Politicians from Frederick, Maryland
The American College of Financial Services alumni